Dalmeny can refer to:

 Dalmeny, a village and parish in Scotland
 Dalmeny, New South Wales, a coastal town in Australia
 Dalmeny, Ontario, a community in Canada
 Dalmeny, Saskatchewan, a town in Canada